De Gelderlander (founded 1848) is a Dutch daily newspaper focused on Gelderland and immediate surroundings. It is published in Nijmegen by the Belgian Persgroep.

De Gelderlander evolved in 1848 from the Nijmegen biweekly newspaper De Batavier, published from 1843 to 1845.

Contributors

Thomas von der Dunk

References

External links

 Official website

Daily newspapers published in the Netherlands
Mass media in Gelderland
Nijmegen